The 2023 Portland, Maine mayoral election will be held on November 7, 2023, to elect the mayor of Portland, Maine. The election will be officially nonpartisan, though incumbent mayor Kate Snyder is a member of the Democratic Party. In September 2022, Snyder announced that she would not seek re-election to a second term in office.

Candidates

Potential 
 Pious Ali, at-large city councilor
 April Fournier, at-large city councilor
 Roberto Rodriguez, at-large city councilor

Declined 
Emily Figdor, member and former chair of the Portland Board of Education
Michael Kebede, former chair of the Portland Charter Commission
Kate Snyder, incumbent mayor (Party affiliation: Democratic)
 Ethan Strimling, former mayor (Party affiliation: Democratic)

References 

2023 Maine elections
2023 United States mayoral elections
2023
21st century in Portland, Maine
Non-partisan elections